"Something Beautiful Remains" is a single released by Grammy Award-winning singer Tina Turner in 1996 on Tina's Wildest Dreams album. 

This single was released exclusively in Europe and the version used was the Joe Urban Remix Edit, a slightly different edit was later included as a hidden track on the U.S. edition of the Wildest Dreams album.

As shown in the promo video, on certain dates of the 1996/1997 Wildest Dreams Tour the track was played as the final encore. In 2004 the original Wildest Dreams album version of the song was the closing track on the hits compilation All the Best.

Versions
 Album version – 4:22
'Joe' Urban Remix	
'Joe' Urban Remix Edit

Chart performance

References

Tina Turner songs
1996 singles
Songs written by Graham Lyle
Songs written by Terry Britten
1996 songs
Parlophone singles